Sorgenfreispira ardovinii is a species of sea snail, a marine gastropod mollusk in the family Mangeliidae.

Description
The length of the shell attains 3.7 mm, its diameter 1.4 mm.

Distribution
This marine species occurs in the Atlantic Oceran off Senegal.

References

External links
  Mariottini P., Di Giulio A., Smriglio C. & Oliverio M. (2015). Additional notes on the systematics and new records of East Atlantic species of the genus Sorgenfreispira Moroni, 1979 (Gastropoda Mangeliidae). Biodiversity Journal. 6(1): 431-440
 
 MNHN, Paris: Sorgenfreispira ardovinii

ardovinii